Thomas Waring (12 October 1906 – 20 December 1980) was an English professional association footballer. Nicknamed "Pongo" after a famous cartoon of the time, Waring is one of Aston Villa's all-time great centre forwards. In his career, he scored 243 league goals in 363 matches over 12 seasons for 5 different clubs.

Career
He signed for Tranmere Rovers in 1926 and scored 6 goals in an 11-1 victory against Durham City in January 1928. He moved to Aston Villa for £4,700 in 1928. As well as playing football, Waring also worked for The Hercules Motor and Cycle Company in Aston.

Aston Villa
A crowd of 23,000 saw him play on his Villa debut in a reserve game against local rivals Birmingham City, in which he scored a hat-trick.

His 226 appearances for Villa yielded 167 goals, including 10 hat-tricks and a club record 49 league goals in the 1930–31 season, 50 goals in all competitions. He is considered an Aston Villa legend, a reputation buoyed by his likeable personality as discussed by Villa's captain of the day, Billy Walker. In Walker's autobiography, he wrote:

Later clubs
In November 1935, Waring went to Barnsley, angering many Villa fans and prompting 5,000 of them to call for his return to the club. After a spell at Barnsley, Waring also played for Wolverhampton Wanderers, Tranmere Rovers (for a second time), Accrington Stanley, Bath City, Ellesmere Port Town, Graysons, Birkenhead Docks and Harrowby. He guested for New Brighton in 1939–40, and after the war he returned for a second spell with Ellesmere Port Town.

International career
Waring was also capped five times by England, scoring four goals between 1931-32.

Death
He died in December 1980 at the age of 74. His ashes were scattered in the Holte End goal mouth before a game against Stoke City.

References

External links
Aston Villa career details at Aston Villa Players Database
 

1906 births
1980 deaths
People from Birkenhead
Association football forwards
English footballers
England international footballers
Tranmere Rovers F.C. players
Aston Villa F.C. players
Barnsley F.C. players
Wolverhampton Wanderers F.C. players
Accrington Stanley F.C. (1891) players
Bath City F.C. players
Ellesmere Port Town F.C. players
Harrowby F.C. players
New Brighton A.F.C. players
English Football League players
First Division/Premier League top scorers
Everton F.C. wartime guest players